Saïdou Simporé (born 31 August 1992) is a Burkinabé professional footballer who plays as a right back for Egyptian Premier League side Al Ittihad.

International career
In January 2014, coach Brama Traore invited him to be a part of the Burkina Faso squad for the 2014 African Nations Championship. The team was eliminated in the group stages after losing to  Uganda and Zimbabwe and then drawing with Morocco.

References

External links
 

1992 births
Living people
Burkinabé footballers
Association football midfielders
Burkina Faso international footballers
2014 African Nations Championship players
Burkina Faso A' international footballers
2021 Africa Cup of Nations players
Burkinabé Premier League players
Egyptian Premier League players
Rail Club du Kadiogo players
AS SONABEL players
El Dakhleya SC players
Al Masry SC players
Al Ittihad Alexandria Club players
Burkinabé expatriate footballers
Burkinabé expatriate sportspeople in Egypt
Expatriate footballers in Egypt
21st-century Burkinabé people
Sportspeople from Ouagadougou